Reynoldsia may refer to:

 Reynoldsia (plant), an obsolete genus of plants
 Reynoldsia (fly), a genus of flies in the tribe Coenosiini
 Reynoldsia (annelid), or Norealidys, a genus of earthworms